Wretha Hanson is the director of the Franz Bader Gallery in Washington, D.C. and was the former wife of George Wiley.  In 1980 she was the alternate Vice Presidential nominee of the short-lived Citizens Party as the running mate of Barry Commoner for the state of Ohio; for most states, the candidate was La Donna Harris.  (PDF) 

1980 United States vice-presidential candidates
20th-century American politicians
Living people
Citizens Party (United States) politicians
Female candidates for Vice President of the United States
20th-century American women politicians
Year of birth missing (living people)
21st-century American women